Carlos Gallisá Bisbal (1933 in Camuy, Puerto Rico – 7 December 2018 in San Juan, Puerto Rico) was a Puerto Rican attorney, politician, and independence movement leader.

Education
After graduating from the University of Puerto Rico School of Law, Gallisá practiced labor law. He became politicized through the Vieques protests against the United States Navy.

Politics
He was elected to the House of Representatives as a member of the Puerto Rican Independence Party (PIP) in 1972. In 1973 he left the PIP to join the more radical Puerto Rican Socialist Party (PSP). In 1983, Gallisá became general secretary of the PSP.

Gallisá suffered harassment due to his politics, including a firebombing of his law office. He testified at the United Nations on the decolonization issue.

Following the disbanding of the PSP in 1993, Gallisá became a leader of the New Puerto Rican Independence Movement and later the Hostosian National Independence Movement. He was also a columnist for the newspaper Claridad ("Clarity") and a regular news commentator on "Fuego Cruzado" ("Crossfire"), a radio program aired by WSKN-AM in San Juan, Puerto Rico.

Publications 

 La encrucijada colonial. (1991) Dewey Call Number from the Puerto Rican Collection at the University of Puerto Rico 320.97295 G171e
 Desde Lares. (2010) Dewey Call Number from the Puerto Rican Collection at the University of Puerto Rico 972.95 G171d

Death
Gallisá Bisbal died in his home in San Juan, Puerto Rico, on 7 December 2018. He was 85 years old.

References

External links
Gallisá profile from Voices for Independence online book

Members of the House of Representatives of Puerto Rico
1933 births
2018 deaths
People from Camuy, Puerto Rico
Puerto Rican journalists
Puerto Rican lawyers
Puerto Rico Independence Party politicians
Puerto Rican independence activists
20th-century Puerto Rican lawyers
University of Puerto Rico alumni